Chung Chun-to (born 23 February 1953), also known by his stage name  Kenny Bee, is a Hong Kong singer, musician and actor. He is best known as the singer of the group the Wynners, and as a solo artist who has been active in the Hong Kong entertainment industry for nearly three decades.

Career 
Bee made his break into the Hong Kong entertainment industry in 1973 as a member of the popular 1970s band, the Wynners (溫拿樂隊), sharing vocal duties with Alan Tam. Before joining the Wynners, he was a vocalist and saxophonist on the Hong Kong nightclub circuit, and briefly fronted a band called the Sergeant Majors.

Acting 
As members of the Wynners went separate ways in 1978, Bee embarked on a solo career as an actor in Taiwan, playing lead roles in a number of romantic movies, amongst which were The Story of a Small Town, (directed by Li Hsing, 1979), Good Morning, Taipei (directed by Li Hsing, 1979), both of which won the Golden Horse Award, and The Green, Green Grass of Home (directed by Hou Hsiao-hsien, 1983).

In the eighties Bee moved his base back to Hong Kong, and has since amassed a large number of movie credits, mainly in the genre of romantic comedies. Career highlights include "Let's Make Laugh" (directed by Alfred Cheung, 1983), "Shanghai Blues" (directed by Tsui Hark, 1984), "Fist of Fury 1991" (with Stephen Chow, 1991), "the Chinese Feast" (directed by Tsui Hark, 1995) and "Initial D" (directed by Andrew Lau and Alan Mak, 2005). In addition, he was credited as the director for "100 Ways to Murder Your Wife" (starring himself, Chow Yun-fat and Anita Mui, 1986).

Musicianship 
Alongside acting, Bee develops his career as a solo singer-songwriter and has released over fifty studio and compilation albums, in Cantonese, Mandarin and English, to date.  
The 1980s marked the peak of Bee's popularity with the Hong Kong audience so far,
during which four of his studio albums went gold and two went platinum.
Notable hits from this period include "Let Everything Be Gone With the Wind" (讓一切隨風), "If We Were Meant To Be" (要是有緣) and "A Romance" (一段情).

Known for a distinct, husky voice, the singer penned most of his own hits and plays multiple instruments. In the early days he was often seen on stage with keyboards or a saxophone. In recent performances he usually accompanies himself with a guitar.

Bee released his latest Cantonese solo album, Escape (濤出新天), in December 2006, backed by his new band Black Tea.

Recently, Bee partnered with violin luthier Scott Cao to design their own line of classical guitars, "Bonstar." In 2008, Bee performed a series of solo concerts at the Hong Kong Coliseum, as well as in Singapore and Macau. Aside from working solo, the Wynners continued their world tour.

Personal life 
Bee has a blood brother and six half brothers and sisters, with his father a former real estate agent. He married socialite-turned-actress Teresa Cheung in 1988, with whom he had a son, Nicholas Bee, and a daughter, Chloe Bee. The marriage ended in a high-profile divorce in 1999, feeding tabloids with stories on extramarital affairs, lavish spending habits and financial troubles for many months to come. Bee filed for personal bankruptcy in 2002, which expired on 17 October 2006. 

He is currently living with his second wife Fan Jiang, with whom he has two daughters, Chung Yee (Blythe Belle) and Chung Kwok.

In December 2007, Bee released an autobiography, MacDonnell Road, named after a street in Hong Kong he grew up on.

Filmography

Discography

Cantonese albums 
閃閃星辰 – 1980
不可以不想你 – 1981
說愛就愛 – 1983
要是有緣 – 1983
我行我素 – 1984.07
鍾鎮濤精選 (Collection) – 1984
痴心的一句 – 1985.01
鍾鎮濤(淚之旅) – 1985.09
鍾鎮濤(Trip Mix): 淚之旅/太多考驗 (12" Single Mix) – 1985
情變 – 1986.05
鍾鎮濤(Trip Mix II): 香腸、蚊帳、機關槍/原諒我 (12" Single Mix) – 1986
最佳鍾鎮濤 (New Song + Collection) – 1986
寂寞 – 1987.03
聽濤 – 1987.10
晴 – 1988.05
情有獨鍾 (New Songs + Collection) – 1988.10
人潮內... 我像獨行 – 1989.03
看星的日子 – 30 November 1989
B歌 (Collection, distributed in Singapore) – 1989
鍾鎮濤 (3" CD, Collection) – 1990
不死鳥 – August 1990
仍是真心 – August 1992
全部為你 – January 1994
鍾鎮濤金曲精選 (2 Discs, Collection) – 1993.12
88極品音色系列: 鍾鎮濤 Kenny Bee (Collection) – 1997.07
B計劃 (2 Discs, New Songs + Collection) – March 1998
B歌集 (2 Discs, Collection) – 1998.07
鍾鎮濤dCS聲選輯 (Collection) – 2000.02
俠骨仁心原聲專輯 – 2001.04.20
真經典鍾鎮濤 (Collection) – 2001.07.27
還有你 (2 Discs, Collection) – 2002.08.22
濤出新天 – 2006.12.29
佛誕吉祥 – 2009

Mandarin albums
我的伙伴 – 1979.05.09
早安台北 – 1979.08.20
白衣少女 – 1980
鍾鎮濤專輯 (Collection) – 1981
鍾鎮濤(阿B) (Mandarin/Cantonese) – 1982
表錯七日情(國) (Mandarin/Cantonese) – 1983
哦！寶貝‧為甚麼 – 1983
詩人與情人 – 1989.02
捨不得•這樣的日子 – 1989
捨不得 – 1990
飄 – 1990.09
活出自己 – 1991.06
我的世界只有你最懂 – 1992.06
祝你健康快樂 – 1993.09
情人的眼睛 (Collection) – 1994.02
簡簡單單的生活 – 1994
《煙鎖重樓》 – 1994.11.22
情歌對唱集(寂寞) (with Teresa Cheung, Mandarin/Cantonese) – 1995.05
痴心愛你 – 1995.06
男人 – 2004.02.16

English albums 
Why Worry – 1997

References

External links 

Facebook page

Kenny Bee music database

1953 births
Living people
Hong Kong Buddhists
Hong Kong guitarists
Rhythm guitarists
Cantopop singer-songwriters
Hong Kong male film actors
20th-century Hong Kong male singers
Hong Kong Mandopop singers
Hong Kong Mandopop singer-songwriters
Hong Kong songwriters
English-language singers from Hong Kong
Hong Kong male television actors
21st-century Hong Kong male singers
20th-century Hong Kong male actors
21st-century Hong Kong male actors